The 2019 CIBACOPA was the 19th season of the Circuito de Baloncesto de la Costa del Pacífico (CIBACOPA), one of the professional basketball leagues of Mexico. It started on March 27, 2019, and ended on July 17, 2019. The league title was won by Rayos de Hermosillo, who defeated first-year expansion team Mantarrayas de La Paz in the championship series, 4–3. It was the Rayos' third CIBACOPA title.

There was a total attendance of more than 220,000 on the season.

Overview

Format 
Nine teams participate, playing in one single group. The top eight teams qualify for the playoffs, which are three rounds in a best-of-7 format.

Changes from the previous season 
Nine teams competed in this season.

 Mantarrayas de La Paz joined the league as an expansion team.
 Águilas Doradas de Durango and Garra Cañera de Navolato left the league.
 Frayles de Guasave relocated to Guadalajara and became the Gigantes de Jalisco.
 Náuticos de Mazatlán changed their name to Venados de Mazatlán.

Teams

Draft
The 2019 CIBACOPA draft was held in February. Each team got three picks across three rounds.

Regular season

Playoffs
Source

Statistics

Individual statistic leaders

All-Star Game 
The 2019 CIBACOPA All-Star Game was played in Guadalajara, Jalisco, at the Domo del Code on May 11, 2019. The game was played between Zona Norte (teams from Baja California, Sonora, and northern Sinaloa) and Zona Sur (teams from Baja California Sur, Jalisco and southern Sinaloa). Zona Norte won the game after three quarters 106–88, but a new format was established this year to reset the score for a fourth-quarter period that included a cash bonus for the winning team. Zona Sur won this final period 29–21. Hameed Ali and Tyrone White led all scorers with 26 points each, but Jordan Williams was named All-Star Game MVP with 18 points, 5 rebounds and 3 assists.

Cezar Guerrero won the three-point shootout while Jordan Williams won the dunk contest.

Teams 

Zona Norte
 Hameed Ali (Ostioneros de Guaymas)
 Mychal Ammons (Tijuana Zonkeys)
 Juan Baldenebro (Pioneros de Los Mochis)
 Ray Barreno (Ostioneros de Guaymas)
 José Estrada (Halcones de Ciudad Obregón)
 Anthony Glover Jr. (Pioneros de Los Mochis)
 Cezar Guerrero (Rayos de Hermosillo)
 Jeremy Hollowell (Rayos de Sonora)
 César Martín del Campo (Tijuana Zonkeys)
 Timajh Parker-Rivera (Halcones de Ciudad Obregón)
 Devonta Pollard (Pioneros de Los Mochis)
 Karim Rodríguez (Tijuana Zonkeys)
Coaches:  James Penny (Tijuana Zonkeys) and  Pedro Carrillo (Halcones de Ciudad Obregón)

Zona Sur
 Irwin Ávalos (Mantarrayas de La Paz)
 Barry Chinedu (Caballeros de Culiacán)
 Obinna Oleka (Gigantes de Jalisco)
 Antonio Peña (Mantarrayas de La Paz)
 Joshua Ramírez (Venados de Mazatlán)
 Leonardo Sanchez (Gigantes de Jalisco)
 Akeem Scott (Venados de Mazatlán)
 Arim Solares (Gigantes de Jalisco)
 Nick Waddell (Venados de Mazatlán)
 Tyrone White (Mantarrayas de La Paz)
 Jordan Williams (Gigantes de Jalisco)
 Sammy Yeager (Caballeros de Culiacán)
Coaches:  Andrés Contreras (Caballeros de Culiacán) and  Jeff Moore (Gigantes de Jalisco)

References

External links
 CIBACOPA official standings
 2019 season on Latinbasket.com

CIBACOPA seasons
CIBACOPA
CIBACOPA